is a Japanese manga series written and illustrated by Ohanachan. It was serialized in Kodansha's seinen manga magazine Weekly Young Magazine from January 2018 to March 2020.

Publication
Written and illustrated by Ohanachan, Hen na Chishiki ni Kuwashii Kanojo Takayukashiki Sōko-san was serialized in Kodansha's seinen manga magazine Weekly Young Magazine from January 22, 2018, to March 9, 2020. Kodansha collected its chapters in five tankōbon volumes, released from September 6, 2018, to May 7, 2020.

Volume list

References

Further reading

External links
 

Kodansha manga
Romantic comedy anime and manga
Seinen manga